Timothy "Tim" McIsaac (born 10 January 1959) is a retired Canadian Paralympic swimmer, who was born blind. He was one of the first blind swimmers to do a tumble turn in an international competition. He began swimming at the Ross MacDonald School for the Blind in Brantford, Ontario.

Biography
McIsaac was born in Winnipeg, Manitoba and has been blind since birth. When he was six years old, he would spend ten months of every year living in residence at the school and was far away from home. His father kept in contact with him whenever he attended business trips in Toronto or McIsaac would telephone his family every other week.

Swimming career

Swimming motivation
McIsaac started swimming when he was aged 13: his determination to start focussing on swimming was when he was involved in a car accident in September 1973 outside of his parents' house. He suffered from fractures in both of his legs and a compound fracture on his right arm.

Start of his swimming career
McIsaac first competed in a major competition in 1975 aged sixteen at the Ontario Games for the Physically Disabled held in Cambridge. He had only been swimming for three years but he won five gold medals at his first Games.

Contributions
He has been awarded the Viscount Alexander Award for Junior Male Athlete of the Year in 1976 after his success at the 1976 Summer Paralympics. He won another title in 1982 for being the Athlete of the Year in Manitoba and was honored in Manitoba Sports Hall of Fame in 2000. McIssac was additional inducted into the Canadian Paralympic Committee Hall of Fame in 2013.

As well as being the most decorated Canadian Paralympian and the first blind swimmer to the tumble turn, McIsaac is a legendary role model and his success, along with teammate Michael Edgson, they helped to build the paths of future star swimmers like Donovan Tildesley, Valerie Grand'Maison and Amber Thomas who are all blind swimmers.

References

External links
 Tim McIsaac at Swimming Canada
 

1959 births
Living people
Swimmers from Winnipeg
Paralympic swimmers of Canada
Swimmers at the 1976 Summer Paralympics
Swimmers at the 1980 Summer Paralympics
Swimmers at the 1984 Summer Paralympics
Swimmers at the 1988 Summer Paralympics
Medalists at the 1976 Summer Paralympics
Medalists at the 1980 Summer Paralympics
Medalists at the 1984 Summer Paralympics
Medalists at the 1988 Summer Paralympics
Paralympic medalists in swimming
Paralympic gold medalists for Canada
Paralympic silver medalists for Canada
Paralympic bronze medalists for Canada